Harmogia is a  monotypic genus of flowering plants in the family Myrtaceae. The sole species is Harmogia densifolia which is endemic to Australia.

Harmogia densifolia is a shrub to 1.5 metres high with linear or terete leaves. White flowers appear in spring or summer with 5 round petals surrounding 7 to 10 stamens. It occurs from Nowra in New South Wales northwards through the east of the state and into Queensland.

References

Myrtaceae
Monotypic Myrtaceae genera
Myrtales of Australia
Taxa named by Johannes Conrad Schauer
Endemic flora of Australia